Meroux (pronounced as Méroux) is a former commune in the Territoire de Belfort department in Bourgogne-Franche-Comté in northeastern France. On 1 January 2019, it was merged into the new commune of Meroux-Moval.

Population

See also

Communes of the Territoire de Belfort department

References

Former communes of Territoire de Belfort
Populated places disestablished in 2019